The 2019 Big Sky Conference women's soccer tournament was the postseason women's soccer tournament for the Big Sky Conference held from November 6 to November 10, 2019. The five-match tournament took place at Jackson Stadium, home of the regular-season champions Montana Grizzlies. The six-team single-elimination tournament consisted of three rounds based on seeding from regular season conference play. The Montana Grizzlies were the defending champions and did not successfully defended their title, losing to the Northern Colorado Bears in the semifinals.  Northern Colorado would go on to win the tournament, with a 1–0 win over Eastern Washington in the final.  This was the second overall title for Northern Colorado, and the second title for coach Tim Barrera.

Bracket

Source:

Schedule

First Round

Semifinals

Final

Statistics

Goalscorers 
2 Goals
 Taylor Bray (Northern Colorado)
 Maddie Morgan (Eastern Washington)

1 Goal
 Maddie Barkow (Northern Colorado)
 Alexa Coyle (Montana)
 Sariah Keister (Eastern Washington)
 Madison Kem (Eastern Washington)
 Maddie Morgan (Eastern Washington)
 Erika Munoz (Sacramento State)
 Lexi Pulley (Northern Colorado)
 Kayla Terhune (Northern Arizona)

Own Goals
 Northern Arizona vs. Northern Colorado

All Tournament Team

Source:

<small>MVP in bold

References

External links 
2019 Big Sky Conference Women's Soccer Championship

Big Sky Conference Women's Soccer Tournament
2019 Big Sky Conference women's soccer season